Jean Louis Bourcier (January 3, 1911 – June 20, 1989) was a Canadian professional ice hockey left winger.

Playing career
Bourcier played for the Pittsburgh Shamrocks of the International Hockey League followed by the Montreal Canadiens during the 1935–36 NHL season. His brother Conrad also played for Montreal and Pittsburgh during the same seasons.

Career statistics

References

External links

1911 births
1989 deaths
Canadian expatriate ice hockey players in the United States
Canadian ice hockey left wingers
Montreal Canadiens players
Pittsburgh Shamrocks players
Ice hockey people from Montreal